The COVID-19 Advisory Board was announced in November 2020 by President-elect of the United States Joe Biden as part of his presidential transition. It was co-chaired by physicians David A. Kessler, Marcella Nunez-Smith, and Vivek Murthy and comprises 13 health experts. The board was then succeeded by the White House COVID-19 Response Team upon Biden's presidency in January 2021.

Background
Before naming any White House staff or cabinet appointments, Biden announced that he will appoint a COVID-19 task force, co-chaired by former Surgeon General Vivek Murthy, former Food and Drug Administration Commissioner David Kessler and Yale University epidemiologist Professor Marcella Nunez-Smith. In November 2020, he announced the names of 13 health experts to serve on the COVID-19 Advisory Board. Biden pledged a more and larger federal government response to the pandemic than Donald Trump, akin to President Franklin D. Roosevelt's New Deal during the Great Depression. This would include increased testing for SARS-CoV-2, a steady supply of personal protective equipment, distributing a vaccine and securing money from Congress for schools and hospitals under the aegis of a national "supply chain commander" who would coordinate the logistics of manufacturing and distributing protective gear and test kits. This would be distributed by a "Pandemic Testing Board", also similar to Roosevelt's War Production Board during World War II. Biden also pledged to invoke the Defense Production Act more aggressively than Trump in order to build up supplies, as well as the mobilization of up to 100,000 Americans for a "public health jobs corps" of contact tracers to help track and prevent outbreaks.

Jeffrey Zients will work with the advisory board as the incoming White House Coronavirus Response Coordinator (czar). Civil servant and political advisor, Natalie Quillian, will serve as Deputy Coronavirus Response Coordinator.

Succession
The board was dissolved on January 20, 2021, after President Biden was sworn in. The reason for the dissolution is unknown. The board was then succeeded by the White House COVID-19 Response Team upon Biden's presidency.

Members
There were 16 members of the COVID-19 advisory board, appointed by President of the United States Joe Biden. Three of the members, David A. Kessler, Vivek Murthy and Marcella Nunez-Smith, served as co-chairs.

See also
 Presidency of Joe Biden
 White House Coronavirus Task Force

References

National responses to the COVID-19 pandemic
Organizations established for the COVID-19 pandemic
Task forces
U.S. federal government response to the COVID-19 pandemic
2020 establishments in the United States
2021 disestablishments in the United States
Presidency of Joe Biden